Poornima College of Engineering is the main campus of Poornima Group of Colleges, established in year 1999. It now has three institutions and has grown to 10,000 students.

History 
Poornima College of Engineering was founded in 1999 by the Shanti Education Societ Poornima Group of Colleges comprises Poornima College of Engineering (established 2000), Poornima Institute of Engineering & Technology (established 2007), and Poornima Group of Institutions (established 2009). It is a member of the IBM Software Centre of Excellence. Rajasthan.

Organisation and administration

Departments

 Computer Science and Engineering
 Electrical Engineering
 Electronics and Communication Engineering
 Mechanical Engineering
 Information Technology
 Civil Engineering
Agriculture Engineering

Sister Colleges 

 Poornima University
 Poornima Institute of Engineering and Technology
 Poornima Group of Institutions
 Jodhpur Institute of Engineering and Technology

Student life

Technical Clubs

Society of Automotive Engineers (SAE Club) 
SAE Club provide many benefits to members like tangible contact with their future profession & various objectives on engineering education. SAE Club is a Chapter of Society of Automotive Engineers (SAE-INDIA), Northern Section established in 2018. Currently this collegiate club has more than 90 members from various departments.

Zircon Club 
Zircon Club was established in year 2010 at Poornima College of Engineering. Every year zircon club organizes various technical events and workshops for all the engineering students. Zircon Club guides the student of 1st year of Poornima College of Engineering in making various projects. Members of zircon club have won various prizes by participating in technical event of many IITs, NITs and reputed colleges.

Udaan Aeromodelling Club 
It is an Aeromodelling Club of Poornima Group of Colleges.

Formula Student Teams

Crusade Motorsports 
Crusade Motorsports is a Formula Student team of PCE, Jaipur involved in designing, manufacturing and racing a Formula prototype racecar. Crusade Motorsports aims to provides an opportunity to students to pursue their passion for Automobiles. This Formula Student team participates in national level student competition Supra SAEINDIA organized by SAE International.

Team Hayagriva 
Hayagriva is a student organization built with a vision to pioneer development and deployment of innovative technologies in the Indian Automobile Sector. 30+ students with a formal 3-tier team structure spread across various disciplines are united by a common ambition of being at the forefront of global student motorsports. They design, engineer and race their vehicles at various competitions. The team has always operated independently, transferring the knowledge obtained from year to year. Team Hayagriva participates in Formula Imperial competition organized by ISIE.

External links

See also
 List of universities in India
 Universities and colleges in India
 Education in India
 University Grants Commission (India)

References

Engineering colleges in Jaipur
Educational institutions established in 2000
2000 establishments in Rajasthan